Abdul Aziz Humaid Mubarak Al-Muqbali (born 23 April 1989), commonly known as Abdulaziz Al-Muqbali, is an Omani footballer who plays for Dhofar.

Club career

On 26 July 2012, he signed a one-year contract with Al-Shabab Club. On 11 January 2013, he signed a six-months contract with Saudi Professional League club Al-Taawon FC. On 25 July 2013, he signed a one-year contract with 2012–13 Oman Elite League runners-up Fanja SC. On 3 July 2014, he signed a one-year contract extension with Fanja SC.

On 25 January 2015, he signed a four-month contract and was officially transferred on a four-month loan deal from Fanja SC to Kuwaiti top club, Al-Kuwait SC for the remaining 2014–15 Kuwaiti Premier League season.

International career

Under-22 career
Abdulaziz started his career with the Oman national under-23 football team in 2011 in the 2012 London Olympics qualification when Oman was still fighting for its first ever appearance in football at the Summer Olympics. He scored two goals in Oman's journey in 2012 London Olympics qualification in the Third Round of London Olympics qualification, one in a 1–1 draw against Qatar although later Oman were awarded a 3–0 win as Qatar fielded an ill-eligible player and another in the return leg in a 2–2 draw against Qatar. Oman nearly made its first appearance in football at the Summer Olympics after earning an inter-confederation play-off match with Senegal for a chance qualify for the 2012 Olympics but a 0–2 loss eliminated them from contention.

Gulf Cup of Nations
In the 2013 Gulf Cup of Nations, Abdulaziz made two appearances but failed to score a single goal. Oman could score only one goal and this time it was from the spot by youngster Hussain Al-Hadhri in a 1–2 loss against Qatar. Oman failed to qualify for the semi-finals.

FIFA World Cup qualification
Abdulaziz has made eleven appearances in the 2014 FIFA World Cup qualification scoring two goals. He made his first appearance for Oman on 11 October 2011 in the Third Round of FIFA World Cup qualification in a 0–3 loss against Australia. He scored his first goal for his country later in the Third Round in a 2–0 win over Thailand, which allowed them to progress to the Fourth round of 2014 World Cup qualification for the first time after 2002 FIFA World Cup qualification. Oman entered the last game of group play with a chance to qualify for at least the playoff-round, but a 1–0 loss to Jordan eliminated them from contention.

AFC Asian Cup Qualification
Abdulaziz has made five appearances in the 2015 AFC Asian Cup qualification scoring a goal in a 1–0 win over Syria in Oman's first match.

National team career statistics

Goals for Senior National Team
Scores and results list Oman's goal tally first.

Honours

Club
Dhofar
Omani League: Runner-up 2009–10
Sultan Qaboos Cup: Runner-up 2009

Fanja
Oman Professional League: Runner-up 2013–14
Sultan Qaboos Cup: 2013–14
Oman Super Cup: Runner-up 2013, 2014

Individual
 Top scorer Oman League '''2017-18: 21 goals.

References

External links
 
 
 Abdulaziz Al-Muqbali at Goal.com
 
 
 Abdulaziz Al-Muqbali - ASIAN CUP Australia 2015

1989 births
Living people
People from Sohar
Omani footballers
Oman international footballers
Omani expatriate footballers
Association football forwards
2015 AFC Asian Cup players
Dhofar Club players
Sohar SC players
Al-Shabab SC (Seeb) players
Fanja SC players
Al-Taawoun FC players
Kuwait SC players
Suwaiq Club players
Al-Shamal SC players
Oman Professional League players
Saudi Professional League players
Qatari Second Division players
Expatriate footballers in Saudi Arabia
Omani expatriate sportspeople in Saudi Arabia
Expatriate footballers in Kuwait
Omani expatriate sportspeople in Kuwait
Expatriate footballers in Qatar
Omani expatriate sportspeople in Qatar